The South and Central America Handball Confederation (SCAHC) is the governing body of the Olympic sport of Handball and Beach handball in South America and Central America. It is affiliated to the International Handball Federation (IHF).

SCAHC has 19 members countries located within the South America and Central America. One of IHF's six continental confederations, the SCAHC was formed officially on 5 April 2019 in Cali (Colombia). The SCAHC headquarter is located in Santiago de Chile (Chile).

History
On 14 January 2018, during the IHF Council meeting, Pan-American Team Handball Federation was suspended by International Handball Federation and was divided into two continental confederations namely the North America and the Caribbean Handball Confederation and the South and Central America Handball Confederation. The IHF Council decision was taken on the facts that there are no signs of development in the level of handball and beach handball in the North American, Central American and the Caribbean countries. There was some development in South American level but that was also not comparable to the other continents like Europe, Asia and Africa. No team from Americas had ever reached to the semifinal stage of the IHF World Men's Handball Championship and the IHF Men's Junior World Championship till date. The PATHF appealed to the Court of Arbitration for Sport, and it annulled IHF's decision.

At the Extraordinary IHF Congress 2019 the IHF statues were revised to add the new federations.

SCAHC Presidents

SCAHC Secretaries General

SCAHC Managing Director

SCAHC Council
Following are the members serving 2019 – 2023 term.

SCAHC members
South America

  Argentina
  Bolivia
  Brazil
  Chile
  Colombia
  Ecuador
  French Guiana
  Guyana ✝
  Paraguay
  Peru
  Uruguay
  Venezuela

Central America

  Belize ✝
  Costa Rica
  El Salvador
  Guatemala
  Honduras
  Nicaragua
  Panama

 ✝ means non-active member

Tournaments

National teams
 South and Central American Men's Handball Championship
 South and Central American Women's Handball Championship
 South and Central American Men's Junior Handball Championship
 South and Central American Women's Junior Handball Championship
 South and Central American Men's Youth Handball Championship
 South and Central American Women's Youth Handball Championship
 Central American Handball Championship

Club
 South and Central American Men's Club Handball Championship
 South and Central American Women's Club Handball Championship
 South and Central American Junior Club Handball Championship

Beach
 South and Central American Beach Handball Championship
 South and Central American Club Beach Handball Championship
 South and Central American Youth Beach Handball Championship

Current champions

(Titles)
(*) Record titles

References

External links
 Official website
 SCAHC at IHF

 
National members of the International Handball Federation
+South and Central America